Cantaura is a city in the state of Anzoátegui, Venezuela. It is the capital of Pedro María Freites Municipality.

History
Cantaura, was founded previously under its old name Chamariapa on August 20, 1740, by Fray Fernando Jiménez, Franciscan missionary.

See also
 Cantaura Massacre

References

External links

Cities in Anzoátegui